Suske en Wiske Weekblad was a Belgian comics magazine which debuted in September 15, 1993 and ran in weekly syndication until December 24, 2003. It was based on the popularity of Suske en Wiske and notable for being the last attempt in Flanders to release a new comic book magazine.

History
Every new issue was published on Wednesdays. The magazine mostly published prepublications of comics distributed by Standaard Uitgeverij, such as Suske en Wiske and other comics of Studio Vandersteen. But it also provided a place for Dutch comics and translations of British, American, Walloon and French comic strip series. Some comics were reprints of older series, such as Boule et Bill. Apart from comics the magazine also featured games, posters, interviews, articles, mini-comics and contests.

Thanks to the popularity of Suske en Wiske in Flanders and the Netherlands the magazine sold well. The first issue was a free gift with the 237th Suske en Wiske album De Snikkende Sirene (1993). Still, after a decade of publishing, the magazine was discontinued.

Incomplete list of notable series published in the magazine
 Bakelandt – Hec Leemans
 Benoit Brisefer – Peyo
 Bessy (comics) – Studio Vandersteen
 Biebel – Marc Legendre
 Dik Van Dieren – Gleever
 F.C. De Kampioenen – Hec Leemans
 Jerom – Studio Vandersteen
 De Kiekeboes – Merho
 The Adventures of Nero – Marc Sleen
 Oktoknopie – Gleever
 Roboboy – Luc Cromheecke, Willy Linthout
 De Rode Ridder – Studio Vandersteen
 Sam – Jan Bosschaert, Marc Legendre
 Sarah en Robin – Steven Dupré
 Schanulleke – Studio Vandersteen
 The Smurfs – Peyo
 Suske en Wiske – Studio Vandersteen
 Urbanus – Willy Linthout, Urbanus

Sources

1993 establishments in Belgium
2003 disestablishments in Belgium
1993 comics debuts
2003 comics endings
Comics magazines published in Belgium
Children's magazines published in Belgium
Weekly magazines published in Belgium
Defunct magazines published in Belgium
Dutch-language magazines
Magazines published in Flanders
Magazines about comics
Magazines established in 1993
Magazines disestablished in 2003
Spike and Suzy